Connersville High School is the only high school in Fayette County, Indiana. Connersville High School is located in Connersville, Indiana.

Academics
Connersville High School has been accredited by AdvancED or its predecessors since April 1, 1908. The 2018 U.S. News & World Report annual high school ranking awarded Connersville a bronze rating.

Demographics
The demographic breakdown of the 1,115 students enrolled in 2015-2016 was:
Male - 50.8%
Female - 49.2%
Asian - 0.2%
Black - 1.1%
Hispanic - 1.1%
White - 94.6%
Multiracial - 3.0%

51.3% of the students were eligible for free or reduced-cost lunch. Connersville was a Title I school in 2015–2016.

Athletics

The Connersville Spartans compete in the Eastern Indiana Athletic Conference. The school colors are red and white. The following Indiana High School Athletic Association (IHSAA) sanctioned sports are offered:

Baseball (boys)
Basketball (girls and boys)
Boys state champions - 1972, 1983
Cross country (girls and boys)
Football (boys)
Golf (girls and boys)
Gymnastics (girls)
State champions - 1987, 1988, 1989
Soccer (girls and boys)
Softball (girls)
Swimming (girls and boys)
Tennis (girls and boys)
Track (girls and boys)
Volleyball (girls)
Wrestling

Notable alumni
 Robert Wise – film director, producer and editor
 Scott Halberstadt – actor
 Matt Howard – basketball player

See also
 List of high schools in Indiana

References

External links

Public high schools in Indiana
Fayette County, Indiana
1875 establishments in Indiana